Saarepeedi Parish was a municipality in south-western Estonia, in Viljandi County.

After the municipal elections held on 20 October 2013, Saarepeedi Parish was merged with Paistu, Pärsti, and Viiratsi parishes to form a new Viljandi Parish around the town of Viljandi.

History
Saarepeedi neighborhood was populated 11th-12th century. there were Naanu fort, which speak of findings that have been used as a fortress of 12th-13th century. was first mentioned 1583.

Settlements
Villages in this area include:
Aindu, Auksi, Karula, Kokaviidika,  Moori, Peetrimõisa, Saarepeedi, Taari, Tobraselja,  Tõnissaare, Välgita and Võistre.

References

External links
  

Saarepeedi Parish
Geography of Viljandi County